Turkmenistan's declaration of "permanent neutrality" was formally recognized by the United Nations in 1995. Former President Niyazov stated that the neutrality would prevent Turkmenistan from participating in multi-national defense organizations, but allows military assistance. Its neutral foreign policy has an important place in the country's constitution. Although the Government of Turkmenistan claims to favour trade with and export to the United States, and Turkey, its single largest commercial partner is China, which buys the vast bulk of Turkmen natural gas via the Central Asia–China gas pipeline. Turkmenistan has significant commercial relationships with Russia and Iran and growing cross-border trade with Afghanistan. The Government of Turkmenistan often appears to use the conflicting interests of these regional powers as a means to extract concessions, especially on energy issues.

International disputes
Signing of the Caspian Sea convention in 2018 brought only partial resolution of boundary disputes in the Caspian. Turkmenistan and Uzbekistan have disputes over water-sharing. Turkmenistan shares a long border with Afghanistan, a principal producer of heroin and opium. As a result, a large volume of narcotics are trafficked through Turkmenistan on their way to lucrative markets in Europe and Russia.

Natural resources

Turkmenistan is rich in natural gas, and currently sells most of its gas to China. Turkmenistan unilaterally cut off exports of pipeline natural gas to Iran in 2017 over a payment arrears dispute. Russia ceased buying gas from Turkmenistan in 2016, but resumed small purchases of pipeline gas in 2019. Afghanistan buys liquid petroleum gas, shipped by rail to Ymamnazar and Torghundi for onward delivery by truck. Pakistan provides Turkmenistan warm water as well as Iran and Russia.

Turkmenistan is a partner country of the EU INOGATE energy programme, which has four key topics: enhancing energy security,
convergence of member state energy markets on the basis of EU internal energy market principles, 
supporting sustainable energy development, and attracting investment for energy projects of common and regional interest.

Organisations
Turkmenistan is a member of the United Nations, the International Monetary Fund, the World Bank, the Economic Cooperation Organization, the Organization for Security and Cooperation in Europe, the Organisation of Islamic Cooperation, the Islamic Development Bank, Asian Development Bank, European Bank for Reconstruction and Development, the Food and Agriculture Organization, and the International Organization of Turkic Culture.  

Turkmenistan maintains permanent representatives to the United Nations offices in New York City, Vienna, and Geneva. 

The United Nations maintains a permanent representation staffed by a resident coordinator along with representatives of some UN agencies in Ashgabat.  The Asian Development Bank, European Bank for Reconstruction and Development, Organization for Security and Cooperation in Europe, and European Union have missions in Ashgabat, as well.

Diplomatic relations 

List of countries which Turkmenistan has diplomatic relations with:

Bilateral relations

See also
 List of diplomatic missions in Turkmenistan
 List of diplomatic missions of Turkmenistan

References

External links
Turkmenistan closes border with Uzbekistan
"Potential gas customers line up to welcome new Turkmen leader", Eurasia Daily Monitor
China's ambassador to Turkmenistan, Lu Guisheng, comments on bilateral cooperation
Turkmenistan Foreign Policy in Nations Encyclopedia

 
Turkmenistan